Skyrme is a surname. Notable people with the surname include:

James Skyrme (died 1722), Welsh pirate
Richard Skyrme (born 1960), English cricketer
Thomas Skyrme (1913–2002), British civil servant, army officer, and magistrate
Tony Skyrme (1922–1987), British physicist